Nancy Langley (in marriage Nancy Richard) is an American curler.

At the national level, she is a four-time United States women's champion curler (1979, 1981, 1983, 1988). She competed for USA on four .

She is the first woman inductee as "curler" to the United States Curling Hall of Fame in 2001 (women before her was inducteed as "builder").

Teams

Personal life
Her sister Leslie Frosch is also a curler, they played together on US championships and Worlds.

References

External links 

 National Champions | Granite Curling Club of Seattle
 
 

Living people
American female curlers
American curling champions
Year of birth missing (living people)
Place of birth missing (living people)